Pieces of Me is a solo album by former Affinity vocalist Linda Hoyle.  Only 300 copies of the album were pressed. It is one of Vertigo's rarest albums.

Track listing

Personnel
Linda Hoyle - Vocals
Chris Spedding - Guitars
Karl Jenkins - Piano/Oboe
Jeff Clyne - Bass
John Marshall - Drums/percussion
Colin Purbrook - Piano (track 11)
 Roger Wake - Recording engineer

References 

1971 albums
Cultural depictions of Valerie Solanas
Vertigo Records albums